The 2006 Supercupa României was the 9th edition of Romania's season opener cup competition. The match was played in Bucharest at Stadionul Naţional on 22 July 2006, and was contested between Divizia A title holders, Steaua and Cupa României champions, Rapid. Steaua won the trophy after a late goal by Daniel Opriţa.

Match

Details

References

External links
Romania - List of Super Cup Finals, RSSSF.com

Supercupa Romaniei, 2006
2006
Supercupa României
Supercupa Romaniei 2006